Johann (Johannes)  Kulik (January 1, 1800 – May 5, 1872) considered one of the best Prague makers / luthiers of the 19th century. He was a pupil of Schembera, Prague, and of Martin Stoss, Vienna. 

His workmanship is exemplary throughout. His scrolls, for example, are most beautiful and the material always handsome. Superb choice of woods.

He based his models always on the basis of some fine Italian specimen he had handled including Antonio Stradivari, Joseph Guarneri filius Andreae, Pietro Guarneri, and Giovanni Paolo Maggini.
After 1850, he got enthusiastic about a specimen of Andrea Guarneri and henceforth followed his master almost exclusively.
Some superb examples bear coat of arms, as they were commissioned by nobility.

His chief disciple was ( aside from Josef Barchanek) J.B. Dvorak.

References

 
 
Walter Hamma, Geigenbauer  Der Deutschen Schule Meister Italienischer Geigenbaukunst, Wilhelmshaven 1992, 
Violins & Bows - Jost Thoene 2006
The Violin Makers of Bohemia - Karel Jalovec 
National Gallery in Prague

External links
 Prague - sights, culture

Czechoslovak luthiers
Businesspeople from Prague
1800 births
1872 deaths